The La Puerta Lodge is a historic motel on Central Avenue (former U.S. Route 66) in Albuquerque, New Mexico, which is notable as one of the best-preserved Route 66 era motels remaining in the city. The property was added to the New Mexico State Register of Cultural Properties in 1997 and the National Register of Historic Places in 1998.

The motel consists of three one-story buildings with Pueblo Revival elements. The building on the west side of the property is long and narrow, containing eight motel rooms interspersed with covered parking spaces. A continuous portal (portico) supported by wooden columns with ornamental woodwork extends the full length of the building. There is also an ornately carved wooden door (the titular la puerta) on the front corner facing Central Avenue. The building to the east is a small office and manager's residence, and there is another small residential building at the rear of the property.

References

Hotels in Albuquerque, New Mexico
Hotel buildings on the National Register of Historic Places in New Mexico
New Mexico State Register of Cultural Properties
National Register of Historic Places in Albuquerque, New Mexico
Hotel buildings completed in 1949
Motels in the United States
U.S. Route 66 in New Mexico